Naproxen/diphenhydramine (trade name Aleve PM) is a formulation of naproxen with diphenhydramine marketed by Bayer Healthcare. It is made as an over-the-counter drug. The intended use of the drug is relieve pain specifically when going to sleep.

Adverse effects 

Women in the third trimester of pregnancy should avoid this drug because there is a risk that naproxen, like other NSAIDs, may cause premature closure of the ductus arteriosus.

In October 2020, the U.S. Food and Drug Administration (FDA) required the drug label to be updated for all nonsteroidal anti-inflammatory medications to describe the risk of kidney problems in unborn babies that result in low amniotic fluid. They recommend avoiding NSAIDs in pregnant women at 20 weeks or later in pregnancy.

References

Antihistamines
Combination drugs
Nonsteroidal anti-inflammatory drugs